Jepthe Francois (born 20 March 1999) is a professional footballer from the Turks and Caicos Islands, currently playing for the Turks and Caicos Islands national team.

International career
Francois appeared for the national under-20 team at the 2016 CFU U-20 Tournament.

He made his senior international debut on 8 September 2018, where they suffered a biggest 11–0 defeat to Cuba. On 18 November 2018, Francois scored his first international goal against St. Vincent and the Grenadines in a 3–2 victory.

Career statistics

International

International goals
Scores and results list Turks and Caicos Island's goal tally first.

References

External links
 
 

1999 births
Living people
Association football midfielders
Turks and Caicos Islands international footballers
Turks and Caicos Islands footballers
Turks and Caicos Islands under-20 international footballers